Minden-Ravensberg was a Prussian administrative unit consisting of the Principality of Minden and the County of Ravensberg from 1719–1807. The capital was Minden. In 1807 the region became part of the Kingdom of Westphalia, a client state of Napoleonic France. The territory was restored to Prussia after the Napoleonic Wars and became part of the Minden Region within the new Prussian Province of Westphalia in 1815.

Geography

The province consisted of what is now the Ravensberg Land, between the Teutoburg Forest and the Wiehen Hills, and the Minden Land, north of the Wiehengebirge  to the North German lowlands. Minden-Ravensberg was bounded to the east by the Weser, while other important rivers were the Westphalian Aa and the Else.

Minden was the regional capital in that time, whith other cities such as Bielefeld and Herford being of lower importance. Minden-Ravensberg had a population of 160,301 in 1800 and an area of 2,113 km² in 1806.

Present-day

The territory of Minden-Ravensberg is now within northeastern North Rhine-Westphalia and part of Ostwestfalen-Lippe. It roughly encompasses the districts of Minden-Lübbecke, Herford, northern Gütersloh, and Bielefeld, as greatest town and economic center. Because it belonged to Brandenburg-Prussia for centuries, Minden-Ravensberg is today regarded as a cultural region differing from its neighbors by its Lutheranism and special economic development.

References

1807 disestablishments
Minden
Former states and territories of North Rhine-Westphalia
Subdivisions of Prussia
States and territories established in 1719
1719 establishments in Prussia